Warren Webster Duncan (January 21, 1857 – April 11, 1938) was an American jurist.

Born near Jeffersonville, Illinois, Duncan received his bachelor's degree from Ewing College. He then studied law and received his law degree from Saint Louis University School of Law. Buncan was admitted to the Illinois bar in 1885 and practiced law in Marion, Illinois. Duncan served on the Williamson County, Illinois Board of Education and was a Republican. He served as an Illinois circuit court judge and on the Illinois Appellate Court. Duncan served on the Illinois Supreme Court from 1915 until his retirement in 1933. Duncan died at his home in Marion, Illinois.

References

1857 births
1938 deaths
People from Wayne County, Illinois
Saint Louis University School of Law alumni
Illinois lawyers
Illinois Republicans
School board members in Illinois
Illinois state court judges
Judges of the Illinois Appellate Court
Justices of the Illinois Supreme Court
People from Marion, Illinois
Chief Justices of the Illinois Supreme Court